Holton le Moor is a small village and civil parish in the West Lindsey district of Lincolnshire, England.

Holton le Moor lies on the B1434 road. The nearest towns are Market Rasen  to the south and Caistor  to the north-east. It was formerly served by Holton Le Moor railway station.

In the Domesday account the village is written as "Hoctune". It was within the manor of Caistor in the then Lindsey North Riding, and prior to the Norman Conquest under the lordship of Earl Morcar. By 1086 the manor had fallen under the lordship of Ivo Taillebois and William I.

In 1885 Kelly's noted that the village was in the parish of Caistor, had an 1881 population of 178, and that chief agricultural production of the area was in wheat, barley, oats and turnips.

The Grade II listed Anglican church is dedicated to St Luke. It was re-built in 1854 by a George Place in Early English style, consisting of a chancel, nave, north aisle, and a bell turret with two bells. It was again partly rebuilt in 1926 by H. G. Gamble. The earlier parts of the church are ironstone, the doorway Norman style, and the stoup 13th century. There are memorials to the Dixon family, Lords of the Manor, painted wall decoration in the south chapel and stained glass windows from 1893.

Holton Hall was built in 1785 for Thomas Dixon by a local builder, and is listed, as are the hall's stables. Other listed structures include a farmhouse, cottages and pigeoncote. In 1964 Pevsner noted the school to the west of the church, built in 1913 by H. G. Gamble, and described it as "Nice, friendly, symmetrical, with large windows, and a steep pediment, decorated with rose branches".

St Luke's infant and junior primary Church of England School was associated with the village church. It closed in the summer of 2006, the pupils being sent to attend other nearby village schools. The main school building is now owned by a Girl Guiding association, and the oldest building on the site, built in 1858, lies mostly unused. The oldest remaining structure in the village, the Moot Hall, was often used by the school and is now occasionally used for functions.

Nowadays the farmland surrounding the area is used in the production of Sugar beet and root vegetables.

References

External links

"Holton le Moor", Genuki.org.uk. Retrieved 18 November 2011

Villages in Lincolnshire
Civil parishes in Lincolnshire
West Lindsey District